Between the Sheets is the 22nd album released by The Isley Brothers on their T-Neck imprint on April 24, 1983. The album is notable for the title track, the follow-up hit "Choosey Lover", and the ballad "Touch Me". The song also appeared in the 2007 comedy film, Norbit.

Background

The Isley Brothers recorded songs for the album to react to disappointing sales of their albums, Inside You and The Real Deal, albums that failed to sell and produced no hit singles. The group returned to Bearsville Studios in November 1982 to work on the album. Like previous albums, all the instrumentation and composition was handled by Chris Jasper, Ernie Isley and younger brother Marvin. Some songs were initially devised as songs for a splinter project the trio were working on. Eventually, however, lead singer Ronald Isley sought interest in a few of the tracks, including the title song, which was composed by the trio of Jasper and the younger Isley brothers in response to Marvin Gaye's hit, "Sexual Healing".

Adding additional composition, Ronald helped to compose "Choosey Lover" with the younger brothers with the melody based on Earth, Wind & Fire's "Devotion". Other songs reflected on social commentary included "Slow Down Children", aimed at inner city youth, and the anti-war song, "Ballad for the Fallen Soldier". Much like The Real Deal, Jasper and the other Isleys began adding background vocals to the tracks, whereas in previous Isley records, the vocals had been handled primarily by Ronald and older brothers Kelly and Rudolph. Lead vocals in some songs were often shared by one or two of the brothers. But throughout the entire album, most of the album was vocally led by Ronald.

Release
Released the following April, the album returned the Isleys to the top of the R&B album charts and also peaked at number 19 on the Billboard 200. Both "Between the Sheets" and "Choosey Lover" became top ten hits on the R&B charts with "Between the Sheets" performing below the Hot 100. "Ballad for the Fallen Soldier" and "Let's Make Love Tonight" were released as promotional singles. Although it was not a single, the ballad "Touch Me" was also a hit. Eventually the album was certified platinum by the Recording Industry Association of America for shipments of one million copies alone in the United States.

The following year, due to tax problems the three elder Isley members were dealing with at the time, Ernie, Marvin and Chris Jasper left the group and formed Isley-Jasper-Isley.

Track listing

Personnel
Ronald Isley - lead and background vocals
O'Kelly Isley, Jr. - background vocals, co-lead on "Slow Down Children"
Rudolph Isley - background vocals, co-lead on "Way Out Love" and "Slow Down Children"
Ernie Isley - guitars, drum programming, percussion and background vocals (tracks 1, 3, 4, 5, 7, 8, 9)
Marvin Isley - bass, percussion and background vocals (tracks 1, 3, 4, 5, 7, 8, 9)
Chris Jasper - piano, keyboards, synthesizers, percussion, vocoder and background vocals (tracks 1, 3, 4, 5, 7, 8, 9), lead vocals on "Rock You Good", co-lead on "Way Out Love", rap on "I Need Your Body" and "Ballad for the Fallen Soldier"

Charts

Singles

Samples and covers
The Notorious B.I.G. sampled "Between the Sheets" on his song "Big Poppa" from his 1994 album Ready to Die.
Nas sampled "Choosey Lover" for the remix version of his single "Street Dreams" from his second album It Was Written (1996). In addition to the sample, its lyrics were also interpolated by the single's guest artist R. Kelly. 
Keith Murray sampled "Between the Sheets" on his song "The Most Beautifullest Thing in This World" on his album The Most Beautifullest Thing in This World in 1994.
Da Brat sampled "Between the Sheets" on her song "Funkdafied" on her album Funkdafied in 1994.
Skee-Lo sampled “Between the Sheets” on his song Superman on his album I Wish in 1995.
Aaliyah sampled "Between the Sheets" on her song "Old School" and covered "Choosey Lover" on her album One in a Million in 1996.
Jay-Z sampled "Ballad for the Fallen Soldier" on his song "A Week Ago" on his album Vol. 2... Hard Knock Life in 1998.
Jay-Z sampled "Between the Sheets" on his song "Ignorant Sh*t" on his album American Gangster in 2007.
Kool G Rap sampled "Ballad for the Fallen Soldier" on his song "Cannon Fire" on his album Roots Of Evil in 1998.
Whitney Houston sampled "Between the Sheets" on her song One of Those Days from her 2002 album Just Whitney.
Gwen Stefani sampled "Between the Sheets" on her song "Luxurious" from her 2004 album Love. Angel. Music. Baby.
DJ Khaled sampled Ballad for the Fallen Soldier in his song Billy Ocean in 2017.
Big K.R.I.T sampled “Between the Sheets” on his song “Pick your self” on his album “TDT” in 2018.

References

External links
 The Isley Brothers-Between The Sheets at Discogs

1983 albums
The Isley Brothers albums
T-Neck Records albums